Acridone is an organic compound based on the acridine skeleton, with a carbonyl group at the 9 position.

Synthesis and structure
The molecule is planar. Optical spectra reveal that the keto tautomer predominates in the gas-phase and in ethanol solution.

Acridone can be synthesized by the condensation of aniline and 2-chlorobenzoic acid and subsequently heating of N-phenylanthranilic acid.

History
One of the first who were able to prove the compound's existence was Karl Drechsler, Student of G. Goldschmiedt, at the k.u.k. Universität Wien (Vienna, Austria) in 1914.

Derivatives
Acridone constitutes the scaffold of some synthetic compounds with diverse pharmacological activities. 3-Chloro-6-(2-diethylamino-ethoxy)-10-(2-diethylamino-ethyl)-acridone has shown promise as an  antimalarial drug.

See also
 Quinacridone

References

Aromatic ketones